Abdessamad Archane (Arabic: عبد الصمد عرشان) is a Moroccan politician. He is the secretary general of the Democratic and Social Movement (MDS) and president of the council of the urban municipality of Tiflet.

References 

Moroccan politicians
Year of birth missing (living people)
Living people